Thomas Ronaldson (1855 – 4 December 1931) was a New Zealand cricketer. He played in two first-class matches for Wellington in 1883/84.

See also
 List of Wellington representative cricketers

References

External links
 

1855 births
1931 deaths
New Zealand cricketers
Wellington cricketers